{{Infobox theatre 
|name           = Alhambra Theatre
|image          =
|image_size     = 250px
|caption        = 
|address        = 
|city           = Sacramento, California
|country        = 
|designation    = 
|latitude       = 
|longitude      = 
|architect      = 
|owner          = 
|capacity       = 1990
|type           = Film
|opened         = 1927
|yearsactive    = 
|rebuilt        = 
|closed         = 
|demolished     = 1973
 
|othernames     = Motto: The Showplace of Sacramento|production     = 
|currentuse     = 
|website        = 
}}
The Alhambra Theatre opened in 1927 and was the preeminent movie house in the greater Sacramento area for many years. It was designed in the Moorish style of the great Spanish cities and included a large courtyard and fountain. The interior was lavishly appointed with red carpet, gold trim, and large pillars. It was located directly beyond the eastern terminus of K Street at 1025 Thirty-First Street, now Alhambra Boulevard, Sacramento, California 95816, in the East Sacramento neighborhood.

The theatre was designed by Starks and Flanders, a firm which was founded in Sacramento by New Yorker Leonard Starks in 1922 and designed many other important structures, including the Fox-Senator Theatre, the Elks Building, C. K. McClatchy High School, and the downtown post office.

The theatre was also home to the Alhambra Pipe Organ'', an organ of fifteen ranks built by the Robert Morton Organ Company in 1927. After it was removed in 1960, the instrument was used by the First Baptist Church in Stockton and now resides with the Kautz family at Ironstone Vineyards.

In 1973, a bond measure intended to allow the City of Sacramento to purchase the theatre failed to pass, and the Alhambra was demolished to make way for a Safeway supermarket. An original fountain is still intact and functioning on the south side of the Safeway parking lot. The destruction of the theatre, which was opposed by the public, awakened a preservation movement in Sacramento that remains active today and has adopted “Remember the Alhambra” as a slogan.

Gallery

See also
Crest Theatre
Tower Theatre

References

External links
 Alhambra profile and considerable commentary
 The Alhambra in contemporary Sacramento redevelopment
Postcard view of Alhambra archived from the original on Apr 29, 2008.

Cinemas and movie theaters in California
Buildings and structures in Sacramento, California
Culture of Sacramento, California
Demolished theatres in California
Demolished buildings and structures in California
Former cinemas in the United States
Event venues established in 1927
Former National Register of Historic Places in California
1927 establishments in California
1973 disestablishments in California
Buildings and structures demolished in 1973